= Fanni Tellis Creek =

Stream in Ohio, U.S.

Coordinates: 39°24′38″N 84°18′28″W

Fanni Tellis Creek is a stream in the U.S. state of Ohio.

The creek's name, also spelled "Fannie Tullis", honors a local citizen.
